Jakub Wawszczyk (born 11 January 1998) is a Polish professional footballer who plays as a left-back for Polonia Warsaw.

References

Polish footballers
1998 births
Living people
Association football defenders
Radomiak Radom players
Olimpia Grudziądz players
Arka Gdynia players
Sandecja Nowy Sącz players
Stal Mielec players
Polonia Warsaw players
Ekstraklasa players
I liga players
II liga players
III liga players